(birth name Misako Uehara; 26 March 1937 in Fukuoka, Fukuoka Prefecture, Japan – 2003) appeared in a few Japanese films from the late 1950s, most notably starring as Princess Yuki in Akira Kurosawa's The Hidden Fortress. Following a brief career, she left acting.

Filmography

External links

1937 births
Japanese film actresses
2003 deaths
People from Fukuoka
20th-century Japanese actresses